AlaskaOne (or Alaska One) was a Public Broadcasting Service (PBS) member network of public television stations based in Fairbanks, Alaska from 1995 to 2012. It served communities in Alaska outside Anchorage. It was operated by the University of Alaska Fairbanks.

It comprised five stations:
 KUAC-TV channel 9 (Fairbanks)
 KTOO-TV channel 3 (Juneau)
 KMXT-LP channel 9 (Kodiak)
 KYUK-LD channel 15 (Bethel)
 KIAL-LP/KUCB-LP channel 8 Unalaska (licensed station operated by KUCB radio) (Licensed in Dutch Harbor)

KUAC-TV was the flagship station. The other four stations were locally owned, and occasionally broke off from the main AlaskaOne feed to air local programming. KUAC's massive translator network in the Alaska Interior aired the full network schedule.

KYUK-TV originally aired on full-power channel 4 in Bethel, but reportedly ceased operation and had its license deleted by the FCC on March 20, 2009. According to KYUK's website, in 2004 its signal was moved to low-power K15AV. However, it renamed the low-powered TV station as KYUK-LP (now KYUK-LD).

KUAC-TV signed on in 1971 as the first public television station in Alaska. KYUK followed in 1972, with KTOO coming online in 1978. The three stations merged into the AlaskaOne network in 1995.

Some AlaskaOne programs were also seen on Alaska's omnibus network, the Alaska Rural Communications Service, which is partially owned by AlaskaOne.

The organization also operates a radio network, which uses material from National Public Radio, American Public Media, Public Radio International, the Alaska Public Radio Network, and CoastAlaska.

In November 2011, AlaskaOne's corporate entity, Alaska Public Broadcasting Service, voted to transfer the network's operations from KUAC-TV to KAKM effective July 1, 2012. Claiming that this arrangement would do financial harm to KUAC, UAF announced on December 8 that KUAC-TV would leave AlaskaOne and revert to being a separate station at that time. On July 1, KUAC-TV officially relaunched as a separate station, while KTOO-TV and KYUK merged with KAKM to form Alaska Public Television.

Stations

KUCB-LP, channel 8, is a low-powered station operating at 10 watts. Further information about the station is unavailable.

References

External links
 AlaskaOne
 KUAC-TV
 KTOO-TV
 KMXT
 KYUK
 
 
 
 
 YouTubeInaugural broadcast of KUAC-TV on December 22, 1971, including introductory comments from University of Alaska president William Ransom Wood

1995 establishments in Alaska
2012 disestablishments in Alaska
PBS member networks
Television channels and stations disestablished in 2012
Television channels and stations established in 1995
Television stations in Alaska
Defunct mass media in Alaska
Defunct television stations in the United States